The United States Exploring Expedition of 1838–1842 was an exploring and surveying expedition of the Pacific Ocean and surrounding lands conducted by the United States. The original appointed commanding officer was Commodore Thomas ap Catesby Jones. Funding for the original expedition was requested by President John Quincy Adams in 1828; however, Congress would not implement funding until eight years later. In May 1836, the oceanic exploration voyage was finally authorized by Congress and created by President Andrew Jackson.

The expedition is sometimes called the U.S. Ex. Ex. for short, or the Wilkes Expedition in honor of its next appointed commanding officer, United States Navy Lieutenant Charles Wilkes. The expedition was of major importance to the growth of science in the United States, in particular the then-young field of oceanography. During the event, armed conflict between Pacific islanders and the expedition was common and dozens of natives were killed in action, as well as a few Americans.

Preparations 
Through the lobbying efforts of Jeremiah N. Reynolds, the United States House of Representatives passed a resolution on May 21, 1828, requesting President John Quincy Adams to send a ship to explore the Pacific. Adams was keen on the resolution and ordered his Secretary of the Navy to ready a ship, the Peacock. The House voted an appropriation in December but the bill stalled in the US Senate in February 1829. Then, under President Andrew Jackson, Congress passed legislation in 1836 approving the exploration mission. Again, the effort stalled under Secretary of the Navy Mahlon Dickerson until President Van Buren assumed office and pushed the effort forward.

Originally, the expedition was under the command Commodore Jones, but he resigned in November 1837, frustrated with all of the procrastination. Secretary of War Joel Roberts Poinsett, in April 1838, then assigned command to Wilkes, after more senior officers refused the command. Wilkes had a reputation for hydrography, geodesy, and magnetism. Additionally, Wilkes had received mathematics training from Nathaniel Bowditch, triangulation methods from Ferdinand Hassler, and geomagnetism from James Renwick.

Personnel included naturalists, botanists, a mineralogist, a taxidermist, and a philologist.

On the afternoon of August 18, 1838, the vessels weighed anchor and set to sea under full sail. By 0730 the next morning, they had passed the lightship off Willoughby Spit and discharged the pilot. The fleet then headed to Madeira, taking advantage of the prevailing winds.

Coincidentally, Commodore George C. Read in command of the East India Squadron aboard the flagship frigate USS Columbia, together with the frigate USS John Adams, were at the time in the process of circumnavigating the globe when the ships paused for the second Sumatran punitive expedition, which required no detour.

Ships and personnel 
The expedition consisted of nearly 350 men, many of whom were not assigned to any specific vessel. Others served on more than one vessel.

Ships 

  – sloop-of-war, 780 tons, 18 guns, flagship
  – sloop-of-war, 650 tons, 22 guns
  – full-rigged ship, 468 tons, 7 guns
  – brig, 230 tons, 10 guns
  – schooner, 110 tons, 2 guns
  – schooner, 96 tons, 2 guns
  – brig, 250 tons, 2 guns

Command 

 Charles Wilkes – Expedition commander and commandant of Vincennes
 Cadwalader Ringgold – Lieutenant commandant of Porpoise
 Andrew K. Long – Lieutenant commandant of Relief
 William L. Hudson – Commandant of Peacock
 Samuel R. Knox – Commandant of Flying Fish
 James W. E. Reid – Commandant of Sea Gull

Naval officers 

 James Alden – Lieutenant
 Daniel Ammen - Passed midshipman
 Thomas A. Budd – Lieutenant and cartographer
 Simon F. Blunt – Passed midshipman
 Augustus Case – Lieutenant
 George Colvocoresses – Midshipman
 Edwin De Haven – Acting Master 
 Henry Eld  – Midshipman
 George F. Emmons – Lieutenant
 Charles Guillou – Assistant surgeon
 William L. Maury – Lieutenant
 William Reynolds – Passed midshipman
 Richard R. Waldron – Purser
 Thomas W. Waldron – Captain's clerk

Scientific corps 

 Alfred T. Agate – Artist
 James Drayton – Artist
 William Brackenridge – Assistant botanist
 Joseph P. Couthouy – Conchologist
 James D. Dana – Mineralogist and geologist
 Horatio Hale – Philologist
 Titian Peale – Naturalist
 Charles Pickering – Naturalist
 William Rich – Botanist

History

Expedition

First part 
Wilkes was to search for vigias, or shoals, as reported by John Purdy, but failed to corroborate those claims for the locations given. The squadron arrived in the Madeira Islands on September 16, 1838, and Porto Praya on October 6. The Peacock arrived at Rio de Janeiro on November 21, and the Vincennes with brigs and schooners on November 24. However, the Relief did not arrive until the November 27, setting a record for slowness, 100 days. While there, they used Enxados Island in Guanabara Bay for an observatory and naval yard for repair and refitting.

The Squadron did not leave Rio de Janeiro until January 6, 1839, arriving at the mouth of the Río Negro on January 25. On February 19, the squadron joined the Relief, Flying Fish, and Sea Gull in Orange Harbor, Hoste Island, after passing through Le Maire Strait. While there, the expedition came in contact with the Fuegians. Wilkes sent an expedition south in an attempt to exceed Captain Cook's farthest point south, 71°10'.

The squadron joined the Peacock in Valparaiso on May 10, but the Sea Gull was reported missing. On June 6, the squadron arrived at San Lorenzo, off Callao for repair and provisioning, while Wilkes dispatched the Relief homewards on June 21. Leaving South America on July 12, the expedition reached Reao of the Tuamotu Group on August 13, and Tahiti on September 11. They departed Tahiti on October 10.

The expedition then visited Samoa and New South Wales, Australia. In December 1839, the expedition sailed from Sydney into the Antarctic Ocean and reported the discovery of the Antarctic continent on January 16, 1840, when Henry Eld and William Reynolds aboard the Peacock sighted Eld Peak and Reynolds Peak along the George V Coast. On the January 19, Reynolds spotted Cape Hudson. On January 25, the Vincennes sighted the mountains behind the Cook Ice Shelf, similar peaks at Piner Bay on January 30, and had covered  of coastline by February 12, from 140° 30' E. to 112° 16' 12"E., when Wilkes acknowledged they had "discovered the Antarctic Continent." Named Wilkes Land, it includes Claire Land, Banzare Land, Sabrina Land, Budd Land, and Knox Land. They charted  of Antarctic coastline to a westward goal of 105° E., the edge of Queen Mary Land, before departing to the north again on February 21.

The Porpoise came across the French expedition of Jules Dumont d'Urville on January 30. However, due to a misunderstanding of each other's intentions, the Porpoise and Astrolabe were unable to communicate. In February 1840, some of the expedition were present at the initial signing of the Treaty of Waitangi in New Zealand. Some of the squadron then proceeded back to Sydney for repairs, while the rest visited the Bay of Islands, before arriving in Tonga in April. At Nuku'alofa they met King Josiah (Aleamotu'a), and the George (Taufa'ahau), chief of Ha'apai, before proceeding onwards to Fiji on May 4. The Porpoise surveyed the Low Archipelago, while the Vincennes and Peacock proceeded onwards to Ovalau, where they signed a commercial treaty with Tanoa Visawaqa in Levuka. Edward Belcher's  visited Ovalau at the same time. Hudson was able to capture Vendovi, after holding his brothers Cocanauto, Qaraniqio, and Tui Dreketi (Roko Tui Dreketi or King of Rewa Province) hostage. Vendovi was deemed responsible for the attack against US sailors on Ono Island in 1836. Vendovi was taken back to the US, but died shortly after his arrival in New York. His skull was then added to the expedition collections and put on display in the Patent Office building in Washington, D.C.

In July 1840, two members of the party, Lieutenant Underwood and Wilkes' nephew, Midshipman Wilkes Henry, were killed while bartering for food in western Fiji's Malolo Island. The cause of this event remains equivocal. Immediately prior to their deaths, the son of the local chief, who was being held as a hostage by the Americans, escaped by jumping out of the boat and running through the shallow water for shore. The Americans fired over his head. According to members of the expedition party on the boat, his escape was intended as a prearranged signal by the Fijians to attack. According to those on shore, the shooting actually precipitated the attack on the ground. The Americans landed sixty sailors to attack the hostile natives. Close to eighty Fijians were killed in the resulting American reprisal and two villages were burned to the ground.

Return route 

On August 9, after three months of surveying, the squadron met off Macuata. The Vincennes and Peacock proceeded onwards to the Sandwich Islands, with the Flying Fish and Porpoise to meet them in Oahu by October. Along the way, Wilkes named the Phoenix Group and made a stop at the Palmyra Atoll, making their group the first scientific expedition in history to visit Palmyra. While in Hawaii, the officers were welcomed by Governor Kekuanaoa, King Kamehameha III, his aide William Richards, and the journalist James Jackson Jarves. The expedition surveyed Kauai, Oahu, Hawaii, and the peak of Mauna Loa. The Porpoise was dispatched in November to survey several of the Tuamotus, including Aratika, Kauehi, Raraka, and Katiu, before proceeding onwards to Penrhyn and returning to Oahu on 24 March.

On April 5, 1841, the squadron departed Honolulu, the Porpoise and Vincennes for the Pacific Northwest, the Peacock and Flying Fish to resurvey Samoa, before rejoining the squadron. Along the way, the Peacock and Flying Fish surveyed Jarvis Island, Enderbury Island, the Tokelau Islands, and Fakaofo. The Peacock followed this with surveys of the Tuvalu islands of Nukufetau, Vaitupu, and Nanumanga in March, followed by Tabiteuea in April. Also in April, the Peacock surveyed the Gilbert Islands of Nonouti, Aranuka, Maiana, Abemama, Kuria, Tarawa, Marakei, Butaritari, and Makin, before returning to Ohau on June 13. The Peacock and Flying Fish then left for the Columbia River on June 21.

In April 1841, USS Peacock, under Lieutenant William L. Hudson, and USS Flying Fish, surveyed Drummond's Island, which was named for an American of the expedition. Lieutenant Hudson heard from a member of his crew that a ship had wrecked off the island and her crew massacred by the Gilbertese. A woman and her child were said to be the only survivors, so Hudson decided to land a small force of marines and sailors, under William M. Walker, to search the island. Initially, the natives were peaceful and the Americans were able to explore the island, without results. It was when the party was returning to their ship that Hudson noticed a member of his crew was missing.

After making another search, the man was not found and the natives began arming themselves. Lieutenant Walker returned his force to the ship, to converse with Hudson, who ordered Walker to return to shore and demand the return of the sailor. Walker then reboarded his boats with his landing party and headed to shore. Walker shouted his demand and the natives charged for him, forcing the boats to turn back to the ships. It was decided on the next day that the Americans would bombard the hostiles and land again. While doing this, a force of around 700 Gilbertese warriors opposed the American assault, but were defeated after a long battle. No Americans were hurt, but twelve natives were killed and others were wounded, and two villages were also destroyed. A similar episode occurred two months before in February when the Peacock and the Flying Fish briefly bombarded the island of Upolu, Samoa following the death of an American merchant sailor on the island.

The Vincennes and Porpoise reached Cape Disappointment on April 28, 1841, but then headed north to the Strait of Juan de Fuca, Port Discovery, and Fort Nisqually, where they were welcomed by William Henry McNeill and Alexander Caulfield Anderson. The Porpoise surveyed the Admiralty Inlet, while boats from the Vincennes surveyed Hood Canal, and the coast northwards to the Fraser River. Wilkes visited Fort Clatsop, John McLoughlin at Fort Vancouver, and William Cannon on the Willamette River, while he sent Lt. Johnson on an expedition to Fort Okanogan, Fort Colvile and Fort Nez Perces, where they met Marcus Whitman. Like his predecessor, British explorer George Vancouver, Wilkes spent a good deal of time near Bainbridge Island. He noted the bird-like shape of the harbor at Winslow and named it Eagle Harbor. Continuing his fascination with bird names, he named Bill Point and Wing Point. Port Madison, Washington and Points Monroe and Jefferson were named in honor of former United States presidents. Port Ludlow was assigned to honor Lieutenant Augustus Ludlow, who lost his life during the War of 1812.

The Peacock and Flying Fish arrived off Cape Disappointment on July 17. However, the Peacock went aground while attempting to enter the Columbia River and was soon lost, though with no loss of life. The crew was able to lower six boats and get everyone into Baker's Bay, along with their journals, surveys, the chronometers, and some of Agate's sketches. A one-eyed Indian named George then guided the Flying Fish into the same bay.

There, the crew set up "Peacockville", assisted by James Birnie of the Hudson's Bay Company, and the American Methodist Mission at Point Adams. They also traded with the local Clatsop and Chinookan Indians over the next three weeks, while surveying the channel, before journeying to Fort George and a reunion with the rest of the squadron. This prompted Wilkes to send the Vincennes to San Francisco Bay, while he continued to survey Grays Harbor.

From the area of modern-day Portland, Wilkes sent an overland party of 39 southwards, led by Emmons, but guided by Joseph Meek. The group included Agate, Eld, Colvocoresses, Brackenridge, Rich, Peale, Stearns, and Dana, and proceeded along an inland route to Fort Umpqua, Mount Shasta, the Sacramento River, John Sutter's New Helvetia, and then onwards to San Francisco Bay. They departed September 7, and arrived aboard the Vincennes in Sausalito on October 23, having traveled along the Siskiyou Trail.

Wilkes arrived with the Porpoise and Oregon, while the Flying Fish was to rendezvous with the squadron in Honolulu. The squadron surveyed San Francisco and its tributaries, and later produced a map of "Upper California". The expedition then headed back out on October 31, arriving Honolulu on November 17, and departing on November 28. They included a visit to Wake Island, and returned by way of the Philippines, Borneo, Singapore, Polynesia, and the Cape of Good Hope, reaching New York on June 10, 1842.

The expedition was plagued by poor relationships between Wilkes and his subordinate officers throughout. Wilkes' self-proclaimed status as captain and commodore, accompanied by the flying of the requisite pennant and the wearing of a captain's uniform while being commissioned only as a Lieutenant, rankled heavily with other members of the expedition of similar real rank. His apparent mistreatment of many of his subordinates, and indulgence in punishments such as "flogging round the fleet" resulted in a major controversy on his return to America. Wilkes was court-martialled on his return, but was acquitted on all charges except that of illegally punishing men in his squadron.

Significance 
The Wilkes Expedition played a major role in the development of 19th-century science, particularly in the growth of the American scientific establishment. Many of the species and other items found by the expedition helped form the basis of collections at the new Smithsonian Institution.

Of no less importance, over 60,000 plant and bird specimens were collected. A staggering amount of data and specimens were collected during the expedition, including the seeds of 648 species, which were later traded, planted, and sent throughout the country. Dried specimens were sent to the National Herbarium, now a part of the Smithsonian Institution. There were also 254 live plants, which mostly came from the home stretch of the journey, that were placed in a newly constructed greenhouse in 1850, which later became the United States Botanic Garden.

Alfred Thomas Agate, engraver and illustrator, created an enduring record of traditional cultures such as the illustrations made of the dress and tattoo patterns of natives of the Ellice Islands (now Tuvalu).

A collection of artifacts from the expedition also went to the National Institute for the Promotion of Science, a precursor of the Smithsonian Institution. These joined artifacts from American history as the first artifacts in the Smithsonian collection.

Published works 
For a short time Wilkes was attached to the Office of Coast Survey, but from 1844 to 1861 he was chiefly engaged in preparing the expedition report. Twenty-eight volumes were planned, but only nineteen were published. Of these, Wilkes wrote the multi-volume Narrative of the United States exploring expedition, during 1838, 1839, 1840, 1841, 1842, Hydrography, and Meteorology.

The Narrative concerns the customs, political and economic conditions of many places then little-known. Other contributions were three reports by James Dwight Dana on Zoophytes, Geology, and Crustacea. In addition to shorter articles and reports, Wilkes published Western America, including California and Oregon, and Theory of the Winds. The Smithsonian Institution digitized the five volume narrative and the accompanying scientific volumes. The mismanagement that plagued the expedition prior to its departure continued after its completion. By June 1848, many of the specimens had been lost or damaged and many remained unidentified. In 1848 Asa Gray was hired to work on the botanical specimens, and published the first volume of the report on botany in 1854, but Wilkes was unable to secure the funding for the second volume.

Notes

References

Bibliography

External links

 Alfred Agate Collection at Naval History and Heritage Command
 US Exploring Expedition – at Smithsonian Institution Libraries Digital Collections
 Video of Dr. Adrienne Kaeppler discussing the Smithsonian Institution Anthropology collections from the expedition
 Charles L. Erskine's Panorama Lecture at Dartmouth College Library

 
1838 in the United States
1839 in Antarctica
Artifacts in the collection of the Smithsonian Institution
Circumnavigations
Exploration of North America
Explorers of the United States
Global expeditions
History of science and technology in the United States
Military expeditions of the United States
Oceanography
Pacific expeditions
Pacific Ocean
United States Navy in the 19th century